Potato Mountain is a mountain near Claremont, California at the southern edge of the San Gabriel Mountains. It is one of the first mountains visitors encounter entering the Angeles National Forest. Its summit is about 3,422 feet above sea level.

References 

San Gabriel Mountains
Mountains of Los Angeles County, California
Claremont, California
Angeles National Forest
Mountains of Southern California